The Malka, also known as Balyksu, is a river in Kabardino-Balkaria in Russia, which forms the northwest part of the Terek basin. The Malka originates in the glaciers on the northern slopes of Mount Elbrus, flows north and then east. Near the point where it joins the great northwest bend of the Terek it receives several northeast-flowing rivers such as the Baksan. The town of Prokhladny is along the Malka.

References

Rivers of Kabardino-Balkaria

26/10/1942-1943 Germans crossed the River Mlaka, near Nalchik and Malchik to get to Grozny, "The Terrible"